Scream of the Real is the third studio album by Australian band The Radiators. The album was released in May 1983 and peaked at number 15 on the Australian Albums Chart; becoming the band's first top twenty album. The album was certified gold.

Track listing

Charts

References

The Radiators (Australian band) albums
1983 albums
EMI Records albums